This is a list of number-one singles during the 2020s according to the Sverigetopplistan, a chart that ranks the best-performing singles of Sweden.

Number-one singles

External links 
  Sverigetopplistan
 Swedishcharts.com

Number-one singles
Sweden
2020s